Caudellia is a genus of snout moths. It was described by Harrison Gray Dyar Jr. in 1904, honoring his colleague Andrew Nelson Caudell.

Species
 Caudellia apyrella (Dyar, 1904)
 Caudellia colorella (Dyar, 1914)
 Caudellia declivella (Zeller, 1881)
 Caudellia floridensis Neunzig, 1990
 Caudellia galapagosensis Landry & Neunzig, 2006
 Caudellia nigrella (Hulst, 1890)
 Caudellia pilosa Neunzig, 2006

References

Phycitinae